Bhikhna Thori railway station (भिखना ठोरी रेलवे स्टेशन) is a small terminus railway station on Narkatiaganj–Bhikhna Thori branch line in West Champaran district, Bihar. Its code is BKF. It serves Bhikhna Thori village. The station consists of two platforms.

Bhikhna Thori is terminal station before the Indo-Nepal border.

Gauge conversion 
Presently services are suspended on this 36 km line since 2015, as it is undergoing gauge conversion, from metre to broad gauge. The final section between Gawnaha and Bhikhna Thori (13 km) passes through dense forest and needs a special permit from the Forest Department allowing construction works. As of August 2019, the permit has not been given. According to the Forest Department, Gawnaha – Bhikhna Thori section should be closed and the railway land transferred to them.

See also 

 Narkatiaganj Junction railway station
 Raxaul Junction railway station

References

External links 
 

Railway stations in West Champaran district
Samastipur railway division
Railway terminus in India